The Dingo Principle is an Australian satirical comedy series created by Patrick Cook and Phillip Scott which was produced and broadcast by the Australian Broadcasting Corporation (ABC) in 1987.

In addition to Cook and Scott, the show's cast included Jonathan Biggins, Drew Forsythe, Geoff Kelso, Antonia Murphy and Deni Gordon. Cook, Scott, and Kelso had also written and performed in an earlier satirical program, The Gillies Report, but Cook stressed that the only similarities between the shows was that they "were both about current affairs and were both on the ABC". The program was recorded in front of a live audience on Saturday nights, and broadcast on Monday nights.

Although only ten episodes were made and shown in a late night time-slot, the program is remembered for causing several diplomatic incidents. On 20 April 1987, the program performed a mock interview with the Ayatollah Khomeini, resulting in two Australian diplomats being expelled from Tehran and threats of trade sanctions from Iran. Two weeks later, when the program lampooned Mikhail Gorbachev and Vladimir Lenin, the press attaché of the Soviet Embassy in Canberra wrote a letter of rebuke to the managing director of the ABC, David Hill:

The letter also hinted that the ABC's proposed Moscow bureau could be jeopardised by the sketch.

These incidents were raised in the Parliament of Australia on 11 May 1987, when National Party MP John Sharp questioned the Minister for Communications Michael Duffy about the effect of the show on Australia's economy and trade relationships. Duffy stressed the independence of the ABC, and stated it would be inappropriate for him, his department, or the Australian government to intervene in ABC programming decisions.

References

External links

Australian comedy television series
Australian satirical television shows
Australian Broadcasting Corporation original programming
1987 Australian television series debuts
1987 Australian television series endings